The Rabindra Puraskar (also Rabindra Smriti Puraskar) is the highest honorary literary award given in the Indian state of West Bengal. This award is named after the famous Indian poet Rabindranath Tagore and is administered by the Government of West Bengal under the aegis of the Paschimbanga Bangla Academy (Bengali Academy of West Bengal), Kolkata.The award is given for creative literature, non-fiction and books about Bengal in Bengali as well as other languages.

From 1950 to 1982 this award was conferred on one or more writers for a particular outstanding work of him. From 1983 to 2003 this award was conferred to one or more writers as a recognition of their lifetime achievement. In 2004 and 2005, again this award was conferred on one or more writers for a particular outstanding work. Since 2006 this award again is being conferred to one or more writers as a recognition of their lifetime achievement.
Sisir Kumar Das is missing from the list. He got the award twice, in 1976 and 1987.

Recipients

1950–1959

1960–1969

1970–1982

1986–2005

2006–2012

2013–2018

2020-Present

See also 
Ananda Puraskar
Bankim Puraskar
Sahitya Akademi Award to Bengali Writers
Bangla Academy Award

References

External links 
Report of 2005 award, North East Diary, The Telegraph, 10 May 2005
Report of 2006 award, Timeout, The Telegraph, 3 July 2006
 Report of 2006 award – President of AIIS receives Distinguished Award, Council of American Overseas Research Centers

Bengali-language writers